The Geschwind–Galaburda hypothesis was proposed by Norman Geschwind and Albert Galaburda to explain sex differences in cognitive abilities by relating them to lateralization of brain function.  The basic idea is that differences in maturation rates between the cerebral hemispheres are mediated by circulating testosterone levels, and that sexual maturation acts to fix the hemispheres at different relative stages of development after puberty.

According to the theory, male brains mature later than females, and the left hemisphere matures later than the right.

Contradictions
Although the Geschwind–Galaburda hypothesis has been cited in mainstream media and publication resources as a cause for left-handedness, very little research evidence (if any) has been presented to substantiate the theory.  In fact, evidence has emerged suggesting that high prenatal estrogen exposure is just as likely to enhance the gene expression for left-handedness.  In a study endorsed by the Centers for Disease Control (CDC), it is suggested that men who were prenatally exposed to diethylstilbestrol (a synthetic estrogen based fertility drug), are more likely to be left-handed than unexposed men.

See also
 Handedness and sexual orientation

References and further reading

Geschwind, N., & Galaburda, A.M. (1987). Cerebral Lateralization: biological mechanisms, associations and pathology. MIT press: Cambridge, MA.
Geschwind, N., & Galaburda, A.M. (1985a). Cerebral lateralization: Biological mechanisms, associations, and pathology: I. A hypothesis and a program for research. Archives of Neurology, 42, 428–459.
Geschwind, N., & Galaburda, A.M. (1985b). Cerebral lateralization: Biological mechanisms, associations, and pathology: II. A hypothesis and a program for research. Archives of Neurology, 42, 521–552.
Geschwind, N., & Galaburda, A.M. (1985c). Cerebral lateralization: Biological mechanisms, associations, and pathology: III. A hypothesis and a program for research. Archives of Neurology, 42, 634–654.
Geschwind, N. (1979). Specializations of the Human Brain. Scientific American 241(3):180–199. 
Geschwind, N. (1972). Language and the Brain. Scientific American 226 (4):76–83.

Sex differences in humans
Motor skills